Mimodacne is a genus of beetles in the family Erotylidae. It was described by Ernest Marie Louis Bedel in 1917.

This genus comprises some species previously included in Megalodacne but in which the club of the antenna is very large and markedly asymmetrical.

Species
Mimodacne longiuscula Fairm. 1891
Mimodacne rhodesiaca Bedel, 1917
Mimodacne belgarum Bedel, 1917
Mimodacne abnormalis Cr. 1876
Mimodacne imperatrix Gorh. 1883
Mimodacne magnifica Har. 1878
Mimodacne kolbei Kunt, 1908

References

Erotylidae
Cucujoidea genera